Humphrey Repton (christened 20 April 1780 at Springfield, Essex; died 19 December 1819 at Hornchurch, Essex) was an English amateur cricketer.

Personal life
Humphrey Repton was a son of Humphry Repton a noted landscape gardener of the 18th Century. He was educated at Eton College, and at time of his death was associated with the Office for Auditing Public Accounts, Somerset House.

Career
He was mainly associated with Marylebone Cricket Club (MCC) and he made 8 known appearances in first-class matches from 1812 to 1817.

References

External sources
 CricketArchive record

1780 births
1819 deaths
English cricketers
English cricketers of 1787 to 1825
Marylebone Cricket Club cricketers
Surrey cricketers
Middlesex cricketers
E. H. Budd's XI cricketers
William Ward's XI cricketers
George Osbaldeston's XI cricketers